The Nexus 6 (codenamed Shamu) is a phablet co-developed by Google and Motorola Mobility that runs the Android operating system. The successor to the Nexus 5, it is the sixth smartphone in the Google Nexus series, a family of Android consumer devices marketed by Google and built by an original equipment manufacturer partner. Nexus 6 and the HTC Nexus 9 served as the launch devices for Android 5.0 "Lollipop".

The Nexus 6's design and hardware is very similar to that of the second-generation Moto X, which was released around the same time, with the Nexus 6 being enlarged with higher specifications.

Release 
The Nexus 6 was unveiled on October 15, 2014, with pre-order availability since October 29, 2014, and a delivery date in early November. Off-contract pricing in the United States was US$649 for the 32 GB model and US$699 for the 64 GB model. The Nexus 6 was available through Google Play Store, Motorola Mobility, Best Buy, T-Mobile, AT&T, Sprint, U.S. Cellular, and Verizon Wireless in the United States.

In November 2014, availability was announced for 12 other countries, including Australia, Belgium, Canada, France, Germany, India, Italy, Japan, the Netherlands, Spain, Sweden and the United Kingdom.

The AT&T version is SIM-locked, with tethering disabled until a fee is paid to enable it, and comes with custom ringtones.

On January 26, 2015, Motorola (now a subsidiary of Chinese firm Lenovo) announced that a similar device would be released in China, named Moto X Pro; it excludes Google services and applications, but still runs a similarly stock version of Android.

On April 22, 2015, it was announced that the Nexus 6 would be the only phone then supported by Google's new Project Fi venture.

Following the September 2015 release of the Nexus 6's successor, the Nexus 6P, Google stopped selling the Nexus 6 on the Play Store in December 2015. Google has a stated policy of at least two years of software updates and three years (or 18 months after the last sale date on the Play Store, whichever is longer) of security updates. The Nexus 6 had guaranteed software updates through October 2016 and security patches through October 2017; however, Google announced that the Nexus 6 would receive the Android 7.1 update. This update was initially expected in December 2016, but it was delayed until January 5, 2017 due to a "last minute bug". In January 2017, Google announced that the Nexus 6, along with the Nexus 9 tablet, would not receive the 7.1.2 Nougat update, making 7.1.1 the last major software update from Google themselves; however, the phone was to continue to receive monthly security patches while retaining the last major Android version received until October 2017.

Specifications

Hardware 
The Nexus 6 is powered by a 2.7 GHz quad-core Snapdragon 805 processor with 3 GB of RAM, and either 32 or 64 GB of internal storage. It features a 3220 mAh battery with quick charging technology that promises to deliver six hours of operation after 15 minutes of charging. The Nexus 6 uses a 5.96-inch (marketed as six-inch) QHD AMOLED PenTile (RGBG) display with a resolution of 2560×1440 pixels (493 PPI), and includes a 13-megapixel rear-facing camera with optical image stabilization (OIS), surrounded by a dual LED flash ring, and a two-megapixel camera on front.

Like its predecessor, the Nexus 6 does not have a microSD card slot, a removable battery, or an FM radio receiver/transmitter.

The Nexus 6's hardware supports USB On-The-Go for storage devices, the functionality was originally disabled by software but was enabled in later Android updates.

Variants

Software 
The Nexus 6 was Google's first phone to launch with HDR+. HDR+ which takes a burst of shots with short exposures, selectively aligning the sharpest shots and averaging them using computational photography techniques. Short exposures avoids blur, blowing out highlights and averaging multiple shots reduces noise. HDR+ is similar to lucky imaging used in astrophotography. HDR+ is processed on the Qualcomm Hexagon DSP.

The Nexus 6 was released with Android 5.0 Lollipop.

The Nexus 6 was the first Android device to have integrated IMS WiFi calling on T-Mobile, which was issued via an OTA update. WiFi Calling on T-Mobile's network has existed since 2007, although this is the first time native WiFi calling has been integrated into the core of Android. Previously T-Mobile offered WiFi calling on select Android handsets using software from Kineto Wireless.

In September 2015, Android 5.1.1 was rolled out to the Nexus 6, containing a fix for the Stagefright bug.

In November 2015, Nexus 6 started receiving Android 6.0 Marshmallow update across the world.  The following month, the Nexus 6 became one of the first devices to get the Android 6.0.1 update.

On August 22, 2016, Android 7.0 Nougat began rolling out to several supported Nexus devices; however the one for Nexus 6 was delayed. Weeks after the official roll-out, Google stated that the Nexus 6 release would come "in the coming weeks." Nougat was eventually released for the Nexus 6 on October 3, 2016, 6 weeks after the official Nougat release. There has been no official statement on what caused the delay.

On October 11, 2016, Google officially announced Android 7.1 Nougat after it had been debuted with the Google Pixel release the week before. This announcement confirmed that the Nexus 6, along with other supported devices, would receive Android 7.1 in early December. On December 5, 2016, Google announced the official release of Android 7.1.1 Nougat with most supported Google devices receiving the update; however, the Nexus 6 was not included. On December 27, 2016, Google told Android Police that a "last minute bug" was discovered and will delay the update until "early January". Google officially released Android 7.1.1 for the Nexus 6 on January 5, 2017.

Reception 
Matt Swider from TechRadar wrote: "Nexus 6 proves that Google's Nexus program is not only far from dead, it's alive and kicking with a powerful 6-inch phablet that runs its latest Android software. It's bigger than the Note 4, but not better." The Nexus 6 was given 4.5 out of 5 stars in the TechRadar review.

Known issues 
 Some devices delivered through AT&T had a bug that causes the devices to boot to a black screen. AT&T will replace these defective units.
 Devices with Sprint SIM cards experience issues with receiving calls.
 Some devices have an issue that causes the phone's back panel to come off. The issue may be due to the glue used for the back panel or the expanding battery pack that could be a fire hazard. Motorola is offering replacements for affected devices.
 It is heard that Google is downgrading Nexus 6 phones from Android 7.1.1 to 7.0 for unknown reason.
 The Nexus logo on the back of a device is known to peel off.

See also 

 Comparison of Google Nexus smartphones

References

External links
 
 
  – official site (archived)

Android (operating system) devices
Google Nexus
Mobile phones introduced in 2014
Discontinued flagship smartphones
Motorola smartphones
Phablets
Mobile phones with 4K video recording